Glencoe Station is a historic commuter railroad station along Metra's Union Pacific North Line in Glencoe, Illinois. It is officially located on 724 Green Bay Road, however it also runs parallel to Old Green Bay Road, both of which intersect with Park Avenue. As of 2018, Glencoe is the 72nd busiest of Metra's 236 non-downtown stations, with an average of 732 weekday boardings.

As of April 25, 2022, Glencoe is served by 29 inbound trains and 28 outbound trains on weekdays, by all 13 trains in each direction on Saturdays, and by all nine trains in each direction on Sundays.

Like the  train station, Glencoe is in close proximity to the Cook County Forest Preserves' Turnbull Woods, William N. Erickson Preserve, and the Chicago Botanic Garden. Unlike Braeside, Glencoe was built in a partial Romanesque-style for the Chicago and North Western Railway by architect Charles Sumner Frost in 1891. The Green Bay Bike Trail, and the local Veterans Memorial Park are also nearby.

Northbound trains go as far north as Kenosha, Wisconsin, and southbound trains go as far as Chicago’s Ogilvie Transportation Center. The station was considered for listing on the National Register of Historic Places in 1991, but this was not done after the Chicago and North Western Railway, which owned the property, objected.

Bus connections
Pace
  213 Green Bay Road 

Other
 Chicago Botanical Garden Trolley

References

External links

Chicago Botanical Gardens: Directions
Station from Park Avenue from Google Maps Street View

Former Chicago and North Western Railway stations
Metra stations in Illinois
Railway stations in the United States opened in 1891
Railway stations in Cook County, Illinois
Glencoe, Illinois
Union Pacific North Line